The 2021 Ypres Rally (also known as the Renties Ypres Rally Belgium 2021) was a motor racing event for rally cars that was held over three days between 13 and 15 August 2021. It marked the fifty-seventh running of the Ypres Rally. The event was the eighth round of the 2021 World Rally Championship, World Rally Championship-2 and World Rally Championship-3. It was also the fourth round of the 2021 Junior World Rally Championship. The 2021 event was based in Ypres in West Flanders and was contested over twenty-four special stages totalling  in competitive distance.

Local heroes Thierry Neuville and Martijn Wydaeghe won their home rally. Their team, Hyundai Shell Mobis WRT, were the manufacturer's winners. Jari Huttunen and Mikko Lukka won the World Rally Championship-2 category, while Yohan Rossel and Alexandre Coria won the World Rally Championship-3 category. The British crew of Jon Armstrong and Phil Hall was the winner in the junior class.

Background

Championship standings prior to the event
Reigning World Champions Sébastien Ogier and Julien Ingrassia entered the round with a thirty-seven-point lead over Elfyn Evans and Scott Martin. Thierry Neuville and Martijn Wydaeghe were third, a further fifteen points behind. In the World Rally Championship for Manufacturers, Toyota Gazoo Racing WRT held massive a fifty-nine-point lead over defending manufacturers' champions Hyundai Shell Mobis WRT, followed by M-Sport Ford WRT.

In the World Rally Championship-2 standings, Andreas Mikkelsen and Ola Fløene held an eleven-point lead ahead of Mads Østberg and Torstein Eriksen in the drivers' and co-drivers' standings respectively, with Marco Bulacia Wilkinson and Marcelo Der Ohannesian in third. In the teams' championship, Toksport WRT led Movisport by thirty-seven points, with M-Sport Ford WRT in third.

In the World Rally Championship-3 standings, Yohan Rossel led Kajetan Kajetanowicz by sixteen points in the drivers' championship, with Nicolas Ciamin in third. In the co-drivers' championship Maciek Szczepaniak held a twelve-point lead over Alexandre Coria, with Yannick Roche in third.

In the junior championship, Sami Pajari and Marko Salminen led Mārtiņš Sesks and Renars Francis by four points. Jon Armstrong and Phil Hall were third, eleven points further back. In the Nations' standings, Latvia and Finland co-lead United Kingdom by fifteen points.

Entry list
The following crews entered the rally. The event was open to crews competing in the World Rally Championship, its support categories, the World Rally Championship-2 and World Rally Championship-3, Junior World Rally Championship and privateer entries that were not registered to score points in any championship. Ten entries for the World Rally Championship were received, as were five in the World Rally Championship-2 and nineteen in the World Rally Championship-3. A further six crews entered the Junior World Rally Championship in Ford Fiesta Rally4s.

Route

Itinerary
All dates and times are CEST (UTC+2).

Report

World Rally Cars

Classification

Special stages

Championship standings

World Rally Championship-2

Classification

Special stages

Championship standings

World Rally Championship-3

Classification

Special stages

Championship standings

Junior World Rally Championship

Classification

Special stages

Championship standings

Notes

References

External links

  
 2021 Ypres Rally at eWRC-results.com
 The official website of the World Rally Championship

Rally
Belgium
Rally
2021